Newton High School is a public high school located in Newton, Texas, United States and classified as a 3A school by the UIL.  It is part of the Newton Independent School District located in central Newton County.  In 2015, the school was rated "Met Standard" by the Texas Education Agency.

Athletics
The Newton Eagles compete in: Cross Country, Volleyball, Football, Basketball, Powerlifting, Track, Softball & Baseball, Cheer.

State titles
Football -  1974(2A), 1998(3A/D2), 2005(2A/D1), 2017(3A/D2), 2018(3A/D2)

State finalists
Football -  2004(2A/D1), 2014(3A/D2)

Notable alumni
Sam Forse Collins, member of the Texas House of Representatives
James Gulley (born 1965), professional basketball player for Ironi Ramat Gan in the Israeli Basketball Premier League

References

External links
Newton ISD

Public high schools in Texas
Schools in Newton County, Texas